Koropi is an Athens Metro and Suburban Railway station situated at east of the town of Koropi, East Attica in Athens metropolitan area. located in the median strip of the Attiki Odos motorway. It opened to Athens Suburban Railway trains on 30 July 2004, with Athens Metro services calling at this station from 10 July 2006.

The station's platforms have two levels, with each end serving trains from the Athens Metro or the Suburban Railway: Suburban Railway trains stop at the northern end. In contrast, Athens Metro Line 3 trains stop at the southern end.  the station is served by two Suburban Railway and two Metro trains per hour to the airport, one Suburban Railway train to Ano Liosia and one to Pireaus, and one or two Metro trains to Nikaia.

History
The station opened to Athens Suburban Railway (Now line 1) trains on 30 July 2004, two weeks before the 2004 Olympic Games. This first section was not electrified and instead operated DMU'S every half hour. with Athens Metro services calling at this station from 10 July 2006. In 2008, all Athens Suburban Railway services were transferred from OSE to TrainOSE. In 2009, with the Greek debt crisis unfolding OSE's Management was forced to reduce services across the network. Timetables were cutback and routes closed, as the government-run entity attempted to reduce overheads. In 2017 OSE's passenger transport sector was privatised as TrainOSE, currently, a wholly-owned subsidiary of Ferrovie dello Stato Italiane rail infrastructure, remained under the control of OSE and station infrastructure under Gaiose. In July 2022, the station began being served by Hellenic Train, the rebranded TranOSE.

Facilities
The station building is located above a island platform, with access to the platform-level lifts and escalators. The Station buildings are also equipped with a staffed ticket office with gate access. At platform level, there is sheltered seating, with Dot-matrix display departure and arrival screens or timetable poster boards on both platforms. There is a small car park on-site. Outside the station, there is a bus stop where the local 120 308 309 and 330 call.

Services
Since 27 September 2022, the following weekday services call at this station:

Station layout

Future
Koropi is expected to become a junction station with the opening of a 32 km branch line to Lavrio.

References

Athens Metro stations
Transport in East Attica
Railway stations in Attica
Railway stations opened in 2004
Buildings and structures in East Attica
Railway stations in highway medians
2004 establishments in Greece